Titten Tei was a children's television character that first appeared on television in Norwegian fall 1971. The show aired on NRK on Saturdays.

Titten Tei, full name Titten Tei André von Drei, is a puppet made by Karel Hlavaty and brought to life by puppeteer Birgit Strøm. Titten Tei appeared together with Sjonkel Rolf, a.k.a. Rolf Kirkvaag.

External links
Pictures and soundfile

Television characters introduced in 1971